Joaquín Ramírez Fernández (born August 20, 1941, Mexico City) is a Mexican author and retired employee of several sports car racing teams. From 1984 to 2001 Ramírez was coordinator of the McLaren Formula One team, including during the infamous Prost–Senna rivalry of the late-1980s.

Early life
The third of eight children, Ramírez was born in Mexico City and studied mechanical engineering at the National Autonomous University of Mexico (UNAM). Contrary to his father's desires he dropped out in 1960 to follow his friend Ricardo Rodríguez to Europe. Ramírez worked as apprentice mechanic for Scuderia Ferrari for two years. When Rodríguez died in a racing crash in the Mexican GP in 1962, Ramírez first took a job at Maserati and later at Lamborghini as a mechanic of their new line of high-performance road cars. In 1964 he moved to England where he worked for Ford on the GT40, before joining Dan Gurney’s All American Racers team in 1966.

Formula One career
During the 1960s and '70s Ramírez worked for several teams, including Dan Gurney's Eagle, Tyrrell, where founder Ken Tyrrell advised him to keep a diary of his time in the sport, and for Wilson and Emerson Fittipaldi in their Fittipaldi Copersucar F1 team.

In December 1983 Ramírez joined the front-running McLaren Formula One operation as Team Coordinator, becoming close friends with many top drivers including Alain Prost, Ayrton Senna, David Coulthard and Mika Häkkinen.

In 2001, after more than 40 years, Ramírez retired from the Great Circus and was advised by McLaren team manager Ron Dennis not to write his life story as no one would be interested. Ramírez was left in little doubt that Dennis's true aim was to stop any undesirable details of the team's inner workings from becoming public. As a parting gift from F1 David Coulthard and Mika Häkkinen gave him a Harley-Davidson Road King.

Statistics

 479 Grands Prix in which he participated.
 116 triumphs on F1 Grands Prix.
 10 F1 Drivers' World Championships: 1973, 1984, 1985, 1986, 1988, 1989, 1990, 1991, 1998 and 1999.
 5 F1 World Champions: Jackie Stewart (1), Niki Lauda (1), Alain Prost (3), Ayrton Senna (3) and Mika Häkkinen (2).
 7 Constructors' F1 World Championships (McLaren): 1984, 1985, 1988, 1989, 1990, 1991 and 1998.
 8 F1 teams: Ferrari, AAR Eagle, Tyrrell, Fittipaldi-Copersucar, Shadow, ATS, Theodore and McLaren.
 1 World Sportscar Championship (JW-Porsche): 1971.
 1 World Sportscar Drivers' Championship: Pedro Rodríguez and Jackie Oliver.
 4 teams and prototype sports car: Ferrari, Maserati, Ford and JW-Porsche.

After Formula One
In 2005 Ramírez published his life story: Jo Ramirez: Memoirs of a racing man.

Ramírez also has written the foreword of some books like: Los Hermanos Rodríguez 2006, The Brothers Rodríguez, 2009 and La Carrera Panamericana: "The World's Greatest Road Race!", 2008.

During F1 seasons Ramírez has a column in the Mexican newspaper Reforma.

Ramírez was a great supporter and inspiration to Mexican talents like Adrián Fernández, Salvador Durán, Checo Pérez and Esteban Gutiérrez.

He is a member of the Scuderia Rodríguez, Mexico's racing Legion of Honor, and was named to its Hall of Fame of Mexican Motorsport.

Ramírez is fluent in Spanish, English, Italian and Portuguese.

Carrera Panamericana
After his retirement from F1, Ramírez has participated in the Carrera Panamericana, including the fourth place in the A+ Historic category in 2010 in a Volvo.

In the 2012 edition Ramírez and his co-driver Alberto "Beto" Cruz got the podium with a third place in the category of A+ Historic 2,000 cc. Ramírez drove his Volvo P-1800 of Escuderia Telmex and concludes on the 50th overall with a time of 5h.55m.3.1s.

See also 

 Ricardo Rodríguez
 Pedro Rodríguez
 Team McLaren
 Ron Dennis

References

External links
 Jo Ramirez at GrandPrix.com

1941 births
Mexican motorsport people
Mexican racing drivers
Sportspeople from Mexico City
Formula One people
McLaren people
Ferrari people
Living people